Darkness Forever! is a live album by the Norwegian rock band Turbonegro, recorded in 1998 and released in 1999 on Bitzcore Records in Germany and on Get Hip Records in 2000 in the United States. It was recorded on 10 May 1998 at Fabrik in Hamburg, Germany and on 18 December 1998 at Mars in Oslo, Norway, which was the last show of Turbonegro before they disbanded and went on hiatus for four years. There are no overdubs whatsoever on this album.

The album was re-released in May 2005 as a six-panel digipak with extended photo material. It contains five bonus songs (20 all together) and has been remastered. The result is a noticeably improved and better sound compared to the original version.

Artwork
The artwork of the front sleeve was culled from a 70s poster advertising for "The Magic Show" of Canadian magician Doug Henning. The original CD pressing came with a free "Turbojugend" sticker. The limited first edition vinyl pressing (only 3,000 copies) came with the A1 poster from the band's last tour (European "Darkness Forever" tour with Nashville Pussy) designed by Frank Kozik. The sleeve had special relief printing on the cover and there were five more tracks than the CD.

Track listing
All tracks by Turbonegro.

 "The Age of Pamparius" – 6:45
 "Back to Dungaree High" – 3:02
 "Get It On" – 4:01
 "Just Flesh" – 3:15
 "Don't Say Motherfucker, Motherfucker" – 2:14
 "The Midnight NAMBLA" – 2:03
 "Sailor Man" – 2:17
 "Rendezvous with Anus" – 2:28
 "Are Your Ready (for Some Darkness)" – 4:09
 "Selfdestructo Bust" – 3:07
 "Rock Against Ass" – 3:58
 "Prince of the Rodeo" – 4:19
 "Monkey on Your Back" – 3:08
 "Denim Demon" – 2:10
 "I Got Erection" – 8:35
 "Bad Mongo" (on double LP version) – 3:08
 "Zillion Dollar Sadist" (on double LP version, American version and 2005 reissue) – 3:26
 "Death Time" (on double LP version, American version and 2005 reissue) – 2:17
 "Hobbit Motherfuckers" (on double LP version, American version and 2005 reissue) – 1:18
 "Good Head" (on double LP version, American version and 2005 reissue) – 5:42

Personnel
 Hank Von Helvete (Hans Erik Dyvik Husby) – vocals
 Euroboy (Knut Schreiner) – lead guitar
 Rune Rebellion (Rune Grønn) – rhythm guitar
 Pål Pot Pamparius (Pål Bottger Kjærnes) – keyboards, percussion
 Happy-Tom (Thomas Seltzer) – bass
 Chris Summers (Christer Engen) – drums

Production
 Dimitri - layout assistance
 Phranc Kozic - cover design
 Sven Peks - recorder and mixer, Hamburg, Germany
 Michael Wehr - recorder and mixer, Oslo, Norway
 Tom Kvalsvoll - mastering at Strype Audio
 Alex Kayiambakis - photography
 Lord Bard - photography

References

Turbonegro albums
1999 live albums